The Centre for Addiction and Mental Health (College Street site) is a psychiatric hospital in Toronto, Ontario. It is located at 250 College Street, just east of Spadina Avenue. Much of its work focuses on forensic psychology, sex addiction, drug addiction, and research designed to shape public policy.

The hospital was originally founded in 1966 as the Clarke Institute of Psychiatry, after Charles Kirk Clarke, a pioneer in mental health in Canada. In 1998, it merged with several other Ontario institutions to form the Centre for Addiction and Mental Health (CAMH), and the facility is now called the CAMH College Street site.

CAMH's College Street and Spadina Avenue location is the only 24-hour emergency psychiatric care facility in Ontario.

References

External links

Hospitals in Toronto
Psychiatric hospitals in Ontario
Hospitals established in 1966
1966 establishments in Ontario